The Danish Shoemakers' Union (DSF) was a trade union representing workers in the shoemaking industry in Denmark.

The union was founded in 1885.  It later affiliated to the Danish Confederation of Trade Unions (LO), and in 1931 was the federation's only affiliate to vote against accepting wage cuts.  This led it to undertake a three-month strike without support from the federation.

By 1954, the union had 6,042 members.  In 1983, it merged into the Danish Clothing and Textile Workers' Union.

References

Footwear industry trade unions
Trade unions in Denmark
Trade unions established in 1885
Trade unions disestablished in 1983
1885 establishments in Denmark
1983 disestablishments in Denmark